The Dodge Viper (VX I) is the fifth and final generation of the Viper sports car. Introduced in the 2013 model year, the car was entirely redesigned and included features such as an anti-lock braking system, electronic stability control and traction control that made the car compatible to modern vehicle safety standards. The discontinuation of production of the VX I in August 2017 marked the culmination of the Viper sports car.

History and development 
At a dealer conference on September 14, 2010 in Orlando, Florida, the then-Chrysler Group and Fiat CEO Sergio Marchionne was reported to have concluded his remarks by unveiling a rolling 2012 Dodge Viper prototype. There would be cars produced for the 2011 model year. In autumn of 2011, SRT executive Ralph Gilles announced that the next generation of the Viper would debut at the New York Auto Show in April 2012. At the 2013 New York International Auto Show, the all new SRT Viper GTS was unveiled along with plans to enter the car into racing as well. 

As part of Chrysler's plan of turning SRT as a separate vehicle brand within Chrysler Group LLC, the SRT Viper became the brand's halo vehicle. In May 2014, the SRT brand was re-consolidated under Dodge, with former SRT CEO Ralph Gilles continuing as senior vice president of product design and also as the CEO and president of Motorsports. The car was renamed back to Dodge Viper in 2015.

Specifications and performance 
SRT initially offered two versions of the Viper; the SRT Viper and the GTS. The GTS is the premium model offering more creature comforts over the base model. The most notable exterior difference between the two models is the hood. The base model has six functional hood vents while the GTS model only has two. To commemorate the return of the Viper, SRT offered a 'launch edition' package available on 150 GTS models in 2013. All of the launch edition cars were painted in Viper Blue with twin white stripes and came with a serialized dash plaque placed inside their cabins. The interior of the launch edition cars was trimmed in Black Laguna leather with contrast stitching.

The SRT Viper GTS includes leather upholstery, accented colors on the seats, doors, center console and stitching; gun metal trim on the cluster bezel, HVAC outlets, window switch bezels, shifter base, park brake bezel and the integrated passenger grab handle on the center console; Sabelt racing seats with Kevlar and fiberglass shell, carbon-fiber hood, roof, decklid and aluminum door panels, split six-spoke forged aluminum "Venom" wheels with polished face and graphite-painted pockets (standard), fully painted Hyper Black or fully painted low-gloss black finished wheels.

The SRT Viper includes cruise control and controls on the steering wheel. It also features an Alpine surround sound system with an 8.4-inch display with an optional navigation system by Garmin, Sirius-XM satellite radio, and HD radio. The gauge cluster features a four-inch reconfigurable TFT display for vehicle information as well as a "Track Mode" with a built-in track timer, "stoplight" countdown timer display, and other features. Power seats, keyless entry, and heated seats are also new options. A built-in HDD for storing music and photos was also included as standard equipment.

The optional SRT Track Package includes Pirelli P Zero Corsa tires, StopTech slotted two-piece brake rotors and lightweight wheels in Hyper Black or matte black finishes.

Dodge introduced a new GT package in 2015 to fill the gap between the base Viper and the GTS model. The GT package included the two-mode, driver-adjustable suspension and five-mode electronic stability control system from the GTS, along with Nappa leather seats with Alcantara accents and contrast stitching.

The Viper (VX I) is powered by an all-aluminium  V10 engine.

Models and special editions

TA 

The Time Attack (TA) model was introduced in 2013 and had two variants, 1.0 and 2.0, each variant different from the other.  The 1.0 was sold by SRT and was made as a small enhancement for the Viper GTS.

The car now had the addition of the Advanced Aerodynamic Package (two-piece front corner splitters and a rear decklid spoiler made from carbon fiber), lightweight Sidewinder II wheels finished in matte-black, Pirelli P Zero Corsa tires, two-mode Bilstein DampTronic suspension adapted from the GTS, but with firmer levels of damping and a smaller spread between modes, shock dampers, increased spring rates and thicker anti-roll bars, carbon fiber (instead of aluminum) underhood X-brace, carbon fiber rear tail light applique from the Exterior Carbon Fiber Accent Package, two-piece Brembo brake rotors with wider brake annulus, black-anodized Brembo brake calipers painted with the Viper logo in TA Orange, TA logos behind both front wheels and a Stryker decal instead of the standard badge on the hood (TA Orange on the Venom Black cars, black on the TA Orange and Venom White cars), black interior with TA Orange accent stitching on the ballistic cloth seats, instrument panel & cowl, center stack, console, hand brake, shifter boot, and door panels.

On March 18, 2013 MotorTrend tested the SRT Viper TA at Mazda Raceway Laguna Seca, setting the production car lap record in 1:33.62, besting the previous lap time holder Chevrolet Corvette ZR1's 1:33.70 lap time.

Along with the Viper's return to the Dodge brand, the TA 2.0 variant was added for the 2015 model year. The TA 2.0 variant included an updated aero package, comprising a bigger rear wing, new front dive planes, and a new carbon-fiber front splitter. The package improves downforce to 400 pounds at 150 mph versus the 2014 Viper TA 1.0's 278 pounds at 150 mph. Other upgrades included an improved suspension setup, new two-piece Brembo rotors, an improved X-brand, and improved shocks, dampers, springs, and stabilizer bars.

Unlike the TA 1.0, the TA 2.0 retained the  top speed of the standard car. The car's fuel mileage was improved in the 2.0 version, with 13 mpg in city, and 20 mpg on the highway.

ACR 

At SEMA 2014, Dodge presented a Viper ACR concept car based on the new VX I platform. The car was eventually introduced in 2015 for the 2016 model year. The base price of the 2016 ACR was US$121,395 in the United States and CA$159,995 in Canada.

The braking system was supplied by Brembo and comprises  discs with 6-piston calipers up front, and  discs with 4-piston calipers at the rear. The discs were now carbon ceramic, a first for the Viper. The ACR was equipped with Kumho Ecsta V720 ACR tires, a variant of the V720 specifically manufactured for the ACR. The front tires are P295/25R19Z, slightly smaller than the regular Viper, and P355/30R19Z at the rear. The suspension system is manufactured by Bilstein, and has 10 settings for rebound and compression tuning for the dampers.

Options included the ACR Extreme Aero Package, which helped the car break a total of 13 track lap records. The package included the addition of a removable front splitter extension, a new adjustable dual-element rear wing, four dive planes, six removable diffuser strakes, removable brake ducts, and removable hood louvers, and if removed, will reveal a hood gap.

GTC 
The GTC model was introduced in 2015, and had a customization program that offered 8,000 colors and 24,000 hand-painted stripes, 10 wheel choices, 16 interior trims, 6 aero options, and an undisclosed amount of standalone options to choose from. There were a total of 25 million possible build combinations.

Ordering a GTC enrolled a customer in a unique VIP program called Viper Concierge, which according to Dodge, "offers an exclusive point of contact throughout the custom Viper build process." The Concierge process started with the ordering stage, which included Dodge sending customers a paint chip confirming the owner's choice. Shortly thereafter, Dodge sent buyers a 1:18-scale "speed-form" replica in their chosen custom colors, to confirm or deny the build. Once the buyer's color and option selection was locked-in, that car became a one-of-one Viper for that year – no other buyer would be permitted to build a Viper to the same specifications.

Lap records 
In October 2015, the ACR achieved a 7:01.67s laptime at the Nürburgring Nordscheleife with the Extreme Aero Package, which was run by SRT, and lapped by their test driver Dominik Farnbacher. Unfortunately, the lap was unofficial according to SRT.

A crowdfunding attempt started by volunteer Russ Oasis in 2017 on the GoFundMe funding platform began collecting funds to reclaim the lap record on the Nürburgring. Crowdfunding ended up being as high as $198,000. He eventually found himself supported by 377 people, and sponsorship and assistance from Kumho Tire (tire supplier), Prefix Performance (formally known as Arrow Racing Engines) (logistics and parts supplier), ViperExchange (car loaners), and Fox Pro Films (lap filming). SRT test driver, racing driver, and former Nürburgring record holder Dominik Farnbacher returned to the track to help the group retake the record. Racing drivers Luca Stolz, Mario Farnbacher, and Lance David Arnold came in as well. Their target was the second position in street legal vehicles category. The Lamborghini Huracán Performante holding the position at that time had a lap time of 6:52.01. The group went through three attempts, with the lap times of 7:03.45 (set by Dominik Farnbacher), 7:03.23 (set by Mario Farnbacher), and 7:01.30 (set by Lance David Arnold), respectively. Their third trecord-attempting rip to Nürburg, Germany ended after one of the Viper ACRs was crashed as a result of a tire failure. Despite the failure of surpassing the Huracán Performante, the team was still able to make the Viper ACR the fastest American, rear-wheel drive, manual transmission equipped car to go around the track. This lap time also brought the car to fifth position for street legal vehicles in 2017.

Production 
Sales of the Viper in 2013 and 2014 were poor. Production was reduced by 1/3 in October, 2013 and then halted for two months in April, 2014 amid slow sales.

In October 2015, Fiat Chrysler group announced that the Viper would end production in 2017. Initially, Fiat Chrysler cited poor sales as a reason for discontinuing the Viper; however, other sources have stated the car was discontinued because the Viper was unable to comply with FMVSS 226 safety regulations, which requires side curtain air bags. In July 2017, Fiat Chrysler announced they would be permanently closing the Conner Assembly Plant on August 31, 2017.

Chrysler announced five special edition Vipers for the final model year of production.

References 

Viper
Front mid-engine, rear-wheel-drive vehicles
Viper VX I
Cars introduced in 2013
Sports cars